This is a list of football clubs in Jordan.

2018-19 Jordanian Pro League 
Al-Ahli 
Al-Baqa'a SC
Al-Faisaly
Al-Hussein
Al-Jazeera
Al-Ramtha 
Al-Salt
Al-Sareeh
Al-Wehdat
Shabab Al-Ordon
That Ras

2018-19 Jordan League Division 1 
Al-Karmel
Al-Turra
Al-Wahda
Al-Yarmouk
Blama
Dar Al-Dawa
Ittihad Al-Ramtha
Kufrsoum
Ma'an
Mansheyat Bani Hasan
Sahab
Sama Al-Sarhan
Shabab Al-Hussein

2018-19 Jordan League Division 2 and below 
Ain Karem
Al-Asalah
Al-Arabi
Al-Badiah Al-Wosta
Al-Jalil
Al-Mugeer
Al-Qawqazi
Al-Sheikh Hussein
Al Taibah
Ittihad Al-Zarqa
Sihan

Defunct Clubs 
Amman SC

External links 

 RSSSF

Jordan
 
Football clubs
Football clubs